Khalass (English: Enough) is a 2007 Lebanese film by the Lebanese director Borhane Alaouié.

Synopsis

The film is set in present-day Beirut in the midst of chaotic reconstruction. Ahmed and Robby became friends during the war, sharing similar dreams. Like many others, they fought for that dream, but they came out of the war with a bitter feeling of betrayal and disappointment.

Cast
 Fady Abi Khalil as Ahmed
 Haytham Oueidat as 16-year-old Ahmed
 Raymond Hosni as Robby
 Natasha Achkar as Abir
 Jennifer Tabet as Young Abir
 Refaat Tarabay as Raymond
 Wafaa Trabaye as Robby's mother
 Hamzeh Nasrallah as William Nawi
 Ovidio Al Hout as La Chouette
 Hanane Haj Ali as Oum Wissam
 Adel Haidar as Farid
 Wafa Tarabay as Oum Robby
 Diala Kashmar as Gallery woman
 Mahmoud Mabsout as Bus driver

Awards
Dubai International Film Festival 2007
Best Screenplay
Best Editor

References

External links
Arab Cinema Directory

2007 films
2007 comedy-drama films
Lebanese comedy-drama films
2000s Arabic-language films
Films directed by Borhane Alaouié
2007 comedy films
2007 drama films